Talbot Hotel may refer to:

England
 The Talbot Hotel (Northamptonshire), Oundle, Northamptonshire
 Talbot Hotel, a Grade II* listed building in Malton, Ryedale, North Yorkshire
 Talbot Hotel, a listed building in Chipping, Lancashire
 Talbot Hotel, a 13th-century hotel in Tregaron
 Royal Talbot Hotel, Lostwithiel, Cornwall

Wales
 Talbot Hotel, a pub in Berriew, Welshpool, Powys